South Crosland is a village in the metropolitan borough of Kirklees in West Yorkshire, England.

It was originally a chapelry in the civil parish of Almondbury, and became a separate civil parish in 1866.  It became an urban district in 1894 under the Local Government Act 1894.  The parish and urban district was abolished under a County Review Order in 1938, being split between the county borough of Huddersfield, the Holmfirth Urban District, and the Meltham urban district.

See also
Listed buildings in Crosland Moor and Netherton

References

External links

Geography of Kirklees
Villages in West Yorkshire